Nätschen is a mountain location and ski area above Andermatt, in the Canton of Uri, Switzerland. Higher up on Nätschen the mountain is known as Gütsch. It is one of the mountains in the Gotthard Oberalp Arena, as is Gemsstock, which is on the other side of Andermatt. It has 11 ski runs, totaling approximately 21 km of ski pistes, and 4 ski lifts, including a Detachable 4-man Chairlift. Nätschen's lifts are powered by 3 wind turbines, two of which were installed in late 2010 (E-44), the other in 2004 (E-40). These turbines are all made by Enercon. Nätschen has a railway station, run by the Matterhorn Gotthard Bahn, which is between Andermatt and Disentis/Mustér.

Skiing

Ski Runs 

Nätschen has a 2-man chairlift which takes you up to the middle. Here you can choose to
 Go down an easy run (that is actually running down a road, so it is not very steep. This is used as the sledging route as well)
 Go down an intermediate run
 Go down an off-piste run
 Go up a detachable 4-man chairlift

If you choose to go up more, there is
 An easy run
 2 off-piste runs
 3 expert runs
 2 intermediate runs

Ski Lifts 

Nätschen has 4 ski lifts, all made by Garaventa.

Ski Season 

Because Nätschen is fairly low down, and south-west facing, all of its lifts and runs all close relatively early for the summer season, sometimes even as early as the start of March. None of its lifts are open in the summer.

Future 

In 2009 plans to overhaul, replace, update, and insert new ski lifts and runs on Naetschen were announced. This will be part of Orascom Hotels and Development's Andermatt project to make Andermatt a large holiday resort. These plans include
 Several new ski lifts
 A new 8-man gondola from the village up to the middle of Nätschen
 A new combined installation (8-man gondolas and 6-man chairlifts) from the middle of Nätschen to the top
 A connection with the Oberalp/Sedrun ski area with a three lifts; an 8-man gondola and two detachable 4-man chairlifts passing Schneehühnerstock, which is currently possible by getting the train from Nätschen or walking over the Oberalpsee
 Over twice the amount of ski slopes, with most of these new runs being intermediate and expert runs

In 2010 there were two new wind turbines installed on Nätschen, to power the new lifts. These were both Enercon E-44 models. The new lifts will be made by Swedish company SkiStar.

Connection with Oberalp 

In 2009 plans to connect Nätschen's ski area with the Oberalp/Sedrun ski area were announced. This will be done by having 3 ski lifts, two detachable 4-man chairlifts and an 8-man gondola (with a middle station), and approximately 20 km of ski pistes. Most of these pistes will be intermediate/red runs, but with a few easy/blue runs and expert/black runs.

The runs will go from the top of Nätschen (Gütsch), to the Oberalppass station. The T-bar at Oberalppass station will be replaced by a detachable 6-man chairlift.

Lift from Göschenen 

There are plans to construct a gondola running from Göschenen to the top of Naetschen. This will allow for quicker, easier access from other areas, and it will mean Andermatt will not have as much traffic as previously. If arriving from Göschenen, it would save approximately half an hour of time than having to go up to Andermatt, and it will be easier to get onto the slopes.

Railway station 

Nätschen's railway station is owned, run, and served by the Matterhorn Gotthard Bahn. It has one platform, and a passing track for trains which need to pass each other — a common occurrence given that the line is almost all single track, and the trains are running at a tight schedule. Public trains are operated every hour each direction. The station also sees Glacier Express trains and car shuttle trains (in the winter only) passing through it. The station has a waiting room.

Climate

Media 
In November 2012 Andermatt and Nätschen appeared on the British television series The Gadget Show. Presenters Jason Bradbury and Pollyanna Woodward were testing electric bicycles, scooters, and several mobile phone photo editing applications, on the hills of Nätschen.

Gallery

See also 

 Andermatt
 Gemsstock
 Gotthard Oberalp Arena
 Canton of Uri
 Matterhorn Gotthard Bahn
 List of ski areas and resorts in Switzerland
 List of wind turbines in Switzerland

References 

Ski areas and resorts in Switzerland
Andermatt
Tourist attractions in the canton of Uri